Edward J. Cain (died January 13, 1892) served in the South Carolina House of Representatives during the Reconstruction era. He represented Orangeburg. Enslaved from birth he escaped during the American Civil War and served in the Union Army. He served as school commissioner and Sheriff of Orangeburg. He is buried in the Fort Motte area He had a son James L. Cain. James L. was a revered principal and educator who has an elementary school named for him.

References

People from Orangeburg, South Carolina
South Carolina Unionists
19th-century American slaves
South Carolina sheriffs
Union Army soldiers
Members of the South Carolina House of Representatives
1892 deaths
1840 births